The Tibetan Institute of Performing Arts (TIPA) was founded by Tenzin Gyatso, the 14th Dalai Lama on reaching McLeod Ganj, Himachal Pradesh, India in exile from Tibet in August 1959. It was then called  Tibetan Music, Dance and Drama Society, which was one of the first institutes set up by the Dalai Lama, and was established to preserve Tibetan artistic heritage, especially opera, dance, and music.

Tibetan Institute of Performing Arts (TIPA) has been registered as a Society under The Societies Registration Act, 1860 of the Government of India. The institute is a part of the Department of Religion and Culture of Central Tibetan Administration (CTA) and functions as a semi-autonomous body.

Tibet has been celebrated as the Ocean of Songs and Dances (Glu gar gyi rgya mtsho) for hundreds of years. Dance and music have always been integral to the Tibetan culture and are considered to be one of the key components of the traditional “five minor sciences” (Rik ne Chungwa Nga).
By keeping the Tibetan artistic traditions alive and sharing them with the world, TIPA aims to preserve the cultural identity of Tibetans. Students who are interested in the performing arts are trained in the fundamentals of Tibetan music and dance, including an undiluted and comprehensive transmission of traditional folk dance from the three Tibetan provinces of U-Tsang (Central Tibet), Dotoe (Kham), and Domed (Amdo).

Members of this creative and vibrant institute, which is based on the foothills of the Himalayas in McLeod Ganj, Dharamsala of Himachal Pradesh, include instructors, artists, administrative staff, craftsmen, and students who live on the premises of the institute. More than 450 professionals graduated from TIPA and have scattered across the world and many of them work as dance & music teachers in various Tibetan schools and settlements in India, Nepal, Bhutan, and across the world including Europe and North America.

Tibetan Institute of Performing Arts (TIPA) also carries forward the tradition of Ache Lhamo or Tibetan Opera, which was started by Yogi Thangtong Gyalpo in the 14th century in mid-southern Tibet. The institute, under the tutelage of various masters, has maintained an undiluted tradition of Kyormulung (Sukyi Nyima, Pema Woebar, and Drowa Sangmo), Chungpa (Prince Norsang), and Monru Ponsang (Dhepa Tenpa). It is mandatory for all professional artists recruited by TIPA to take mandatory lessons on various traditions of Ache Lhamo. These highly trained and polished students serve as cultural ambassadors of the Tibetan diaspora after becoming fluent in various folk music traditions from different regions of Tibet. The annual 10-day Shoton Festival organized by TIPA attracts people from all over the world. TIPA holds an annual folk opera festival preferably in March or April where almost 11 Opera troops across India and Nepal would participate in the festival which attracts major tourists who are introduced to the core of Tibetan culture.

The performances at the Shoton Festival include singing and dancing by artists in elaborate costumes which are designed in-house at the Handicrafts Centre of the institute.

Aims & Objectives
 To preserve and promote the age-old folk music, opera and dance tradition of Tibet
 To provide performing arts training to young Tibetans
 To work as a traditional Tibetan musical reference centre for students and academics
 To safeguard and showcase ancient costumes of Tibet
 To research and archive old songs and music
 To produce cultural performance videos to promote Tibetan culture

Facilities
 Auditorium
 Conference Hall
 Banquet Hall
 Open-Air Stage
 Recording Studio
 Cultural Show
 Sound and Lighting

Festival
 Shoton Festival 
 Yarkyi Festival

Ngawang N Nornang - Founding Director ( 1959 - 1963) 
Phuntsok Namgyal Dumkhang (1965-1968)
Thupten Samdup (1976-19??)
Jamyang Norbu (1981-1985)
Tsering Wangyal (19??-19??)
Ngodup Tsering (1991-1995)
Jamyang Dorjee Chakrishar (1994-2000)
 Sonam Tashi (Acho Danny)
 Kalsang Yudon Dagpo (2003-2007)
Wangchuk phasur     ( 2007- 2010 )
 Sonam Choephel Shosur (2010-2012)
 Tsering Yangkyi (2012-2014)
 Wangdu Tsering Pesur (2014-2018)
 Ngawang Yonten (2018-2020)
 Sonam Chophel (Acting) (2020-2021)
 Tsering Chonzom ( 2021-2021)
 Ngawang Choephel (2021-)

Notable alumni
Namgyal Lhamo
Tsering Dorjee
Jayang Choende Jack
Tashi Sharzur Techung
Sonam phuntsok (Opera master)
Lobsang samten ( Artiste director)

See also
 Norbulingka Institute

References

External links
 Tibetan Institute of Performing Arts

Dharamshala
Tibetan Buddhist art and culture
Arts organizations established in 1959
Dance schools in India
India–Tibet relations
Tibetan diaspora in India
Buildings and structures in Dharamshala